
Connie May Fowler (born January 3, 1960) is an American novelist, essayist, memoirist, screenwriter, and poet.  Her semi-autobiographical novel, Before Women had Wings, received the 1996 Southern Book Critics Circle Award and the Francis Buck Award (League of American Pen Women).  She adapted the novel for Oprah Winfrey and the subsequent Emmy-winning film starred Winfrey, Ellen Barkin, Julia Stiles, and Tina Majorino.  Remembering Blue received the Chautauqua South Literary Award.   Three of her novels were Dublin International Literary Award nominees.  Her other novels include Sugar Cage and River of Hidden Dreams.  The Problem with Murmur Lee was Redbook's premier book club selection.  Her memoir, When Katie Wakes, explores her family's generational cycle of domestic violence.  How Clarissa Burden Learned to Fly, a novel oft compared to Virginia Woolf's Mrs. Dalloway in term of its structure, was published in 2010. Her latest book, a memoir titled "A Million Fragile bones," will be published April 20, 2017 by Twisted Road Publications. It explores her life on an isolated barrier island and the horrific impact and aftermath of the Deepwater Horizon BP oil spill. Her books have been translated into eighteen languages (https://web.archive.org/web/20170228081631/http://www.conniemayfowler.com/about.html).

Booklist says of "A Million Fragile Bones, "Fowler's elegy to her lost home and chronicle of BP's criminal negligence and the toxic decimation of this coastal haven is uniquely intimate and affecting in its precise elucidation of this tragic, largely invisible apocalypse, offering powerful testimony to the unacceptable risks and profound consequences of reckless oil drilling."

Fowler's essays, touching on a wide range of topics such as family history, the environment, child abuse, domestic violence, Sumo wrestling, popular culture, music, personal relationships, and food have been published in a variety of publications including The New York Times, The Times, Japan Times, International Herald Tribune, Oxford American, Best Life, "The Sun Magazine," and Forum.{http://www.conniemayfowler.com/about.html}

In 2007, Fowler performed at New York City's The Player's Club with actresses Kathleen Chalfont, Penny Fuller, and others in a performance based on The Other Woman, an anthology that includes Fowler's essay “The Uterine Blues.”  In 2003, Fowler performed in a charity benefit performance of The Vagina Monologues with Jane Fonda and Rosie Perez.

Fowler's work has been characterized as southern fiction with a post-modern sensibility.  It often melds magical realism with the harsh realities of poverty.  It generally focuses on working-class people of various racial backgrounds.  She has been cited in sources such as Advancing Sisterhood?: Interracial Friendships in Contemporary Southern Fiction (Monteith, Sharon) and Race Mixing: Southern Fiction Since the Sixties (Jones, Suzanne) as belonging to a “fourth generation” of American writers, black and white,that explodes old notions of race, segregation, and interpersonal racial relationships.

Other publications her work has been cited in include Reclaiming Class: Women Poverty, And the Promise of Higher Education in America, essay by Nell Sullivan, Temple University Press, 2003; Poverty and Children's Adjustment (Developmental Clinical Psychology and Psychiatry) by Suniya Luthar, Transforming Nurses' Stress and Anger: Steps Toward Healing by Sandra P. Thomas, Ph.D., Editors on Editing: What Writers Need to Know About What Editors Do by Gerald C. Gross, Reading Adoption: Family and Difference in Fiction and Drama by Marianne Novy, Secrets of the Zona Rosa: How Writing (and Sisterhood) Can Change Women's Lives by Rosemary Daniell, The Tomorrow Trap: Unlocking the Secrets of the Procrastination-Protection Syndrome by Karen Peterson, The Book Lover's Cookbook: Recipes Inspired by Celebrated Works of Literature, and the Passages That Feature Them by Shaunda Kennedy Wenger, and Oprah Winfrey (Just the Facts Biographies) by Katherine E. Krohn.

Fowler has held numerous jobs including bartender, caterer, nurse, television producer, TV show host, antique dealer, and construction worker. From 1997-2003 she directed the Connie May Fowler Women Wings Foundation, an organization that served at risk women and children. From 2003–2007, she was the Irving Bacheller Professor of Creative Writing at Rollins College and directed their author series “Winter With the Writers.”

Fowler splits her time between Florida, the Yucatan, and Vermont. She earned a Bachelor of Arts (English Literature) from University of Tampa and a Masters of Arts (English Literature with an Emphasis in Creative Writing) from University of Kansas where she studied with the novelist Carolyn Doty.

Connie May Fowler (1960). Her most recent memoir, A Million Fragile Bones, will be released April 2017. Her most recent novel, How Clarissa Burden Learned to Fly, was published by Grand Central/Hachette Book Group in April 2010.  Her short story "Do Not Enter the Memory" was published in the fall/2010 edition of Oxford American. An excerpt from A Million Fragile Bones, was published in the January 2017 issue of The Sun Magazine. She is working on a dystopian novel titled STONE BY STONE. She is a core faculty member of the Vermont College of Fine Arts MFA in Writing program and directs their VCFA Novel Retreat. She, along with her husband Bill Hinson, are founders and directors of The Yucatan Writing Conference (formerly The St. Augustine Writers Conference).

Works

Novels and memoirs 
 A Million Fragile Bones, 2017;
 How Clarissa Burden Learned to Fly, 2010;
 The Problem with Murmur Lee, 2005;
 When Katie Wakes, 2002;
 Remembering Blue, 2000;
 Before Women had Wings, 1996;
 River of Hidden Dreams, 1994;
 Sugar Cage, 1992

Poetry
 Two Thing Thing Poets: Steve Sleboda and Connie May, UT Review, Vol. 5, 1977.
 “A Soliloquy of a Seven Year Old,” “Crowded Closets,” Ann Arbor Review, Vol. 27, Washtenaw Community College, 1977.
 “You Have Created Me,” Goethe's Notes: A Literary Magazine, Vol. 6, 1978.
 “A Purity of Crabs,” “America: The Invitation and Rejection,” “A Celebration of Nothingness,” Outside the Museum: Contemporary Writings — An Anthology, Ann Arbor Review, Vol. 28, Washtenaw Community College, 1978.
 “Genetic Lace,” “The Fear,” Open Twenty-four Hours: Collective Consciousness, Vol. 3, 1984.
 “Kateland,” “Ybor City Number One,” The Midwest Quarterly, A Journal of Contemporary Thought, Vol. XXIX, Pittsburg State University, 1988.
 “Homesick,” Roberts Writing Awards 1988, The H.G. Roberts Foundation, 1988.

External links
Connie May Fowler website

+[amazon.com/author/conniemayfowler]
Lyceum Agency

WAMU 88.5 FM American University Radio — The Diane Rehm Show 
 BookPage Interview February 2000: Connie May Fowler 
 Connie May Fowler — Audio Interview on "When Katie Wakes"
 WordSmitten Spotlight :: Connie May Fowler :: The Problem with Murmur Lee
 Perspective: Cyberia
 The Other Woman anthology

1960 births
Living people
University of Tampa alumni
University of Kansas alumni
American women novelists
20th-century American novelists
American memoirists
American screenwriters
American women poets
21st-century American novelists
American women memoirists
20th-century American women writers
21st-century American women writers
20th-century American poets
21st-century American poets
20th-century American non-fiction writers
21st-century American non-fiction writers